Aska was a Yugoslavian girl group. They came to prominence when they were chosen to represent their state at the 1982 Eurovision Song Contest, where their song "Halo, halo" placed 14th out of 18, with 21 points. It got the top mark of twelve points from the Swedish jury.

The members were Snežana Mišković, Izolda Barudžija and Snežana Stamenković, who retired shortly upon her return from Harrogate and was replaced by Suzana Perović.

Aska recorded several albums before disbanding to pursue solo careers. Mišković remained in pop and established a career with her band, Viktorija. Barudžija faded away after two more Eurovision bids in 1983 and 1984. Perović switched to more commercial folk music and released a few albums before vanishing from the music scene. These included the hits "Pobediće ljubav", "Dežurna pesma" and "Istanbul". Her "Princ iz bajke" and "Zašto ljubomoran nisi" were recorded in 1987 for the Serbian comedy Tesna koža 2, in which she played a singer named Suzi.

References

Yugoslav musical groups
Eurovision Song Contest entrants for Yugoslavia
Eurovision Song Contest entrants of 1982
Serbian pop music groups